Cecil Parker (born Cecil Schwabe, 3 September 1897 – 20 April 1971) was an English actor with a distinctively husky voice, who usually played supporting roles, often characters with a supercilious demeanour, in his 91 films made between 1928 and 1969.

Career
Parker was born in Hastings, Sussex, the second son (and fifth of six children) of German-born Charles August Schwabe, manager of the Albany Hotel, Hastings, and his English wife Kate (née Parker), a church organist. He was educated at St Francis Xavier College, and at Bruges in Belgium.  He served with the Royal Sussex Regiment in the First World War, reaching the rank of sergeant. He began his theatrical career in London in 1922, adopting the surname "Parker" from his mother's maiden name. He made his first film appearance in 1933 and subsequently became a familiar face in British and occasionally American films until his death. He appeared less often on television, but many of his films have remained popular and are often shown.

He acted in two adaptations of A. J. Cronin's novels, The Citadel (1938) and The Stars Look Down (1940), in addition to appearing in The Lady Vanishes (1938) and Under Capricorn (1949). Both of these latter films were directed by Alfred Hitchcock. Other roles were in Storm in a Teacup (1937), The Weaker Sex (1948), 23 Paces to Baker Street (1956), Dangerous Moonlight (1941), Swiss Family Robinson (1960), and I Was Monty's Double (1958), as well as the comedies A French Mistress (1960), The Ladykillers (1955), The Man in the White Suit (1951), The Court Jester (1955) (in which he played an evil, usurping king of England), Indiscreet (1958) and I Believe in You (1952). Parker was also the original Charles Condomine in the West End production of Noël Coward's Blithe Spirit.

He often played a touchy senior officer or British upper class character, and his last two films were true to form: The Magnificent Two (1967) with the British comedy double act Morecambe and Wise and Richard Attenborough's version of Oh! What a Lovely War (1969).

On November 20, 1950, he co-starred with Margaret O'Brien in "The Canterville Ghost", on Robert Montgomery Presents on TV. He played a butler on one episode of The Avengers ("The £50,000 Breakfast").  In 1957 he played Dr. Morelle in BBC radio series, "A Case for Dr. Morelle" (13 episodes).

Personal life
Parker was married to Muriel Anne Randell-Brown (born in Seacombe, Cheshire), from September 1927 until his death in 1971, in Brighton.

Filmography

 The Golden Cage (1933)
 A Cuckoo in the Nest (1933) as Claude Hickett
 The Silver Spoon (1934) as Trevor
 Flat Number Three (1934) as Hilary Maine
 Nine Forty-Five (1934) as Robert Clayton
 Princess Charming (1934) as Mr. Thompson (uncredited)
 The Blue Squadron (1934) as Bianci
 Little Friend (1934) as Mason
 Lady in Danger (1934) as Piker 
 Dirty Work (1934) as Gordon Bray
 Me and Marlborough (1935) as Colonel of the Greys
 Crime Unlimited (1935) as Assistant Commissioner
 The Guv'nor (1935) as Bank Director (uncredited)
 Her Last Affaire (1935) as Sir Arthur Harding
 Foreign Affaires (1935) as Lord Wormington
 Men of Yesterday (1936)
 The Man Who Changed His Mind (1936) as Dr. Gratton
 Dishonour Bright (1936) as Vincent Crane
 Jack of All Trades (1936) as Sir Chas. Darrington
 Dark Journey (1937) as Captain of Q-Boat
 Storm in a Teacup (1937) as Provost William Gow
 Housemaster (1938) as Sir Berkeley Nightingale
 The Lady Vanishes (1938) as Mr. Todhunter
 The Citadel (1938) as Charles Every
 Old Iron (1938) as Barnett
 Sons of the Sea (1939) as Cmdr. Herbert
 She Couldn't Say No (1939) as Jimmy Reeves
 The Stars Look Down (1940) as Stanley Millington
 The Spider (1940) as Lawrence Bruce
 Under Your Hat (1940) as Sir Jeffrey Arlington
 Two for Danger (1940) as Sir Richard
 The Saint's Vacation (1941) as Rudolph
 Dangerous Moonlight (1941) as Specialist
 Ships with Wings (1942) as German Air Marshal
 Caesar and Cleopatra (1945) as Britannus
 The Magic Bow (1946) as Luigi Germi
 Hungry Hill (1947) as Copper John
 Captain Boycott (1947) as Capt. Charles C. Boycott
 The Woman in the Hall (1947) as Sir Halmar Barnard
 The First Gentleman (1948) as The Prince Regent
 The Weaker Sex (1948) as Geoffrey Radcliffe
 Quartet (1948) as Colonel Peregrine (segment "The Colonel's Lady")
 Dear Mr. Prohack (1949) as Arthur Prohack
 Under Capricorn (1949) as The Governor
 The Chiltern Hundreds (1949) as Benjamin Beecham
 Tony Draws a Horse (1950) as Dr. Howard Fleming
 The Man in the White Suit (1951) as Alan Birnley
 The Magic Box (1951) as First Platform Man
 His Excellency (1951) as Sir James Kirkman
 I Believe in You (1952) as Phipps
 Father Brown (1954) as The Bishop
 For Better, for Worse (1954) as Anne's Father
 Isn't Life Wonderful! (1954) as Father
 The Constant Husband (1955) as The Professor
 The Ladykillers (1955) as Claude Courtney
 The Court Jester (1955) as King Roderick I
 23 Paces to Baker Street (1956) as Bob Matthews
 It's Great to Be Young (1956) as Mr. Frome, Headmaster
 True as a Turtle (1957) as Dudley Partridge
 The Admirable Crichton (1957) as Lord Loam
 A Tale of Two Cities (1958) as Jarvis Lorry
 Happy Is the Bride (1958) as Arthur Royd
 Indiscreet (1958) as Alfred Munson
 I Was Monty's Double (1958) as Col. Logan
 The Navy Lark (1959) as Cmdr. Stanton
 The Night We Dropped a Clanger (1959) as Air Vice-Marshal Sir Bertram Bukpasser
 The Wreck of the Mary Deare (1959) as The Chairman
 Sotto dieci bandiere (1960) as Col. Howard
 Follow That Horse! (1960) as Sir William Crane
 A French Mistress (1960) as John Crane M.A. Headmaster of Melbury School
 Swiss Family Robinson (1960) as Captain Moreland
 The Pure Hell of St Trinian's (1960) as Professor Canford
 On the Fiddle (1961) as Gr / Cpt Bascombe
 Petticoat Pirates (1961) as C-in-C
 The Brain (1962) as Stevenson
 The Iron Maiden (1962) as Sir Giles Thompson
 The Amorous Prawn (1962) as Gen. Sir Hamish Fitzadam
 Heavens Above! (1963) as Archdeacon Aspinall
 Carry On Jack (1963) as First Sealord
 Guns at Batasi (1964) as Fletcher
 The Comedy Man (1964) as Thomas Rutherford
 The Amorous Adventures of Moll Flanders (1965) as The Mayor
 A Study in Terror (1965) as Prime Minister
 Lady L (1965) as Sir Percy
 A Man Could Get Killed (1966) as Sir Huntley Frazier
 Circus of Fear (1966) as Sir John
 The Magnificent Two (1967) as Sir John / British Ambassador
 The Avengers (1967) TV Series, Episode: "The £50,000 Breakfast" as Glover
 Oh! What a Lovely War (1969) as Sir John (final film role)

References

External links
 
 
 
 Cecil Parker's performances in the Theatre Archive, University of Bristol

1897 births
1971 deaths
20th-century English male actors
British Army personnel of World War I
British male comedy actors
English male film actors
English male stage actors
English male television actors
English people of German descent
Male actors from Sussex
People from Hastings
Royal Sussex Regiment soldiers
Military personnel from Sussex